Marek Tvrdoň (born January 31, 1993) is a Slovak ice hockey winger who is currently playing for HK Nitra in the Slovak Extraliga. Tvrdoň was drafted 115th overall by the Detroit Red Wings in the 2011 NHL Entry Draft.

Playing career

Junior
Born in Nitra, Slovakia, Tvrdon developed with his hometown's HK Nitra junior program. Beginning at the under-18 level in 2007–08, he went on to the under-20 level two years later, scoring 56 points (25 goals and 31 assists) over 45 games. During the 2009–10 season, he also played six games with HK Nitra's men's team in the Slovak Extraliga.

During the subsequent 2010–11 season, Tvrdon moved to North America to play for the major junior Vancouver Giants of the Western Hockey League (WHL). He began the campaign with 11 points (6 goals and 5 assists) in 12 games before suffering a shoulder injury in mid-October 2010. The following month, he underwent season-ending surgery. In the off-season, he was selected 115th overall in the 2011 NHL Entry Draft by the Detroit Red Wings. Giant general manager Scott Bonner speculated that if he had played the full season prior to the draft, he would have been selected much higher, perhaps as a "first or second-round pick". Tvrdon has been described as a player with size and skill, while Giants head coach Don Hay listed his work ethic as a weakness following his first WHL season.

On January 8, 2014 Tvrdoň was traded by the Vancouver Giants to the Kelowna Rockets for a second-round pick in the 2014 WHL Bantam Draft.

Professional
On July 3, 2012, Tvrdoň signed a three-year entry-level contract with the Detroit Red Wings.

During the final season of his entry-level deal with the Red Wings in 2015–16, Tvrdoň was unable to make an impact within the organization and was primarily assigned to secondary affiliate, the Toledo Walleye of the ECHL. On December 19, 2015, he was placed on unconditional waivers, in order to mutually terminate his contract. He returned to Slovakia and on December 22, 2015, signed a contract for the remainder of the season with HC Slovan Bratislava of the Kontinental Hockey League. Tvrdoň was unable to establish himself in Bratislava, featuring in just 4 scoreless games.

On August 30, 2016, Tvrdoň opted to return to North America as a free agent, agreeing to a one-year deal with the Indy Fuel of the ECHL.

After a spell with HK Nitra in Slovakia, Tvrdoň agreed a deal to move to the Edinburgh Capitals in September 2017.

Tvrdoň has since had spells with MsHK Žilina, Saryarka Karagandy, EC KAC, Nottingham Panthers, KS Cracovia and Dizel Penza.

He re-joined HK Nitra for the 2020-21 season.

International play
Tvrdon represented with Slovakia at the 2010 IIHF World U18 Championships, where he recorded three goals and one assist in six games. Two years later, he represented Slovakia's national junior team at the 2012 World Junior Ice Hockey Championships, where he recorded three goals and one assist in six games, finishing as the second-leading goal scorer on the team. Slovakia finished sixth in the tournament after losing their quarterfinal and the fifth place consolation match.

Career statistics

Regular season and playoffs

International

References

External links

1993 births
Detroit Red Wings draft picks
Edinburgh Capitals players
MKS Cracovia (ice hockey) players
Grand Rapids Griffins players
HC Slovan Bratislava players
Indy Fuel players
HK Nitra players
Nottingham Panthers players
Living people
Sportspeople from Nitra
Slovak ice hockey forwards
Toledo Walleye players
Dizel Penza players
Vancouver Giants players
MsHK Žilina players
Saryarka Karagandy players
Slovak expatriate sportspeople in England
Slovak expatriate sportspeople in Kazakhstan
Slovak expatriate sportspeople in Poland
Slovak expatriate ice hockey players in Canada
Slovak expatriate ice hockey players in the United States
Slovak expatriate sportspeople in Austria
Slovak expatriate sportspeople in Scotland
Slovak expatriate ice hockey players in Russia
Expatriate ice hockey players in England
Expatriate ice hockey players in Kazakhstan
Expatriate ice hockey players in Poland
Expatriate ice hockey players in Austria
Expatriate ice hockey players in Scotland